Pseudabarys is a genus of beetles in the family Carabidae, containing the following species:

 Pseudabarys brasiliensis Chaudoir, 1873
 Pseudabarys columbicus Chaudoir, 1873
 Pseudabarys lebasi Chaudoir, 1873
 Pseudabarys mexicanus Chaudoir, 1873
 Pseudabarys robustus (Bates, 1871)
 Pseudabarys substriatus Chaudoir, 1873

References

Pterostichinae